Biberwier is a municipality with 612 inhabitants (as of 1 January 2019) in the district of Reutte in the Austrian state of Tyrol. The municipality is located in the district court Reutte.

Geography 
The village is located on the southern edge of the Lermooser Moos, between a mountain slope and the landslide landscape of the Fern Pass in the Tyrolean Alps. The municipality is crossed by the Loisach, which springs west of the village. The community is located near the border with Germany on the edge of the Wetterstein Mountains and is visible from the Zugspitze.

History 
The name derives from beavers, who have demonstrably lived in the municipality until 1800 and arrived back in recent years. Corpus of finds from the Roman period bear witness to the early importance of the place on the Via Claudia Augusta. The track grooves at the northern entrance, though referred to as Roman, are from Medieval times. From the Middle Ages to the year 1921, at the Silberleithe, there was the largest mining operation in the Außerfern, called "Gewerkschaft Silberleithen", mining silver, lead and zinc ore. Since the end of 2004, the historical Montan hiking trail Silberleithen opened up this former mining area for tourism. With the Lermooser tunnel, bypassing the village, and opened in 1984, the place was relieved of transit traffic.

Biberwier is located on a bicycle path, which runs as Via Claudia Augusta along an ancient Roman road of the same name.

Today Biberwier with the ski area Marienbergjoch and the swimming lakes Blindsee, Mittersee and Weißensee is a two-season tourism community.

Coat of arms 
Blazon: Divided by gold and blue in the serpent cut, left in the upper field, following the division line, a blue wheel, whose hub is covered with the gold mining markers mallet and iron, right below a sitting, looking to the left beaver. The colors of the community flag are yellow-blue.

The beaver in 1983 awarded municipal coat of arms symbolizes the toponym, mallets and iron refer to the historic mining, the wheel on the important transport system.

Personalities 

  Karl Koch (1887-1971), composer, choirmaster and music teacher
  Johann Weinhart (* 1925), sculptor
  Stefan Schennach (born 1956), politician
  Markus Inderst (* 1974), journalist and author

References

External links

Mieming Range
Cities and towns in Reutte District